Axon Automotive was a British car manufacturer and car components manufacturer based in Northampton, Northamptonshire.  The company is focused on design and material technologies.

Axon unveiled its  hatchback on 23 May 2008 at the Sexy Green Car Show at the Eden Project.  The new car, which was expected to be on sale in 2010, has a claimed CO2 emission rate of less than 80 g/km.

The company was dissolved on 17 November 2020

References

External links
 Official Axon Automotive website

2020 disestablishments in England
British companies disestablished in 2020
Defunct motor vehicle manufacturers of the United Kingdom
Defunct motor vehicle manufacturers of England
Green vehicles
Privately held companies of the United Kingdom